The Albrecht family is a North German family whose members have been prominent as civil servants, politicians and businesspeople.
The family is descended from Barthold Albrecht (born 1557), who was a pastor in Bodenwerder. Numerous of his descendants were doctors, jurists and civil servants in what became the Electorate and Kingdom of Hanover. The family was among the hübsche ("courtly" or "genteel") families of Hanover, the informal third elite group after the nobility and the clergy that encompassed the higher bourgeoisie and university-educated civil servants.

The lawyer Karl Franz Georg Albrecht (1799–1873) became director-general of direct taxation in the Kingdom of Hanover in 1847, and then director-general of customs from 1854 and member of the State Council of Hanover from 1856. He was the father of George Alexander Albrecht (1834–1898), who became a wealthy cotton merchant in the city state of Bremen, where he became part of the Hanseatic elite and was appointed as the Austro-Hungarian Consul in 1895. He married Baroness Louise Dorothea Betty von Knoop (1844–1889), the daughter of the major cotton industrialist, Baron Ludwig Johann von Knoop, who had been ennobled in the Russian Empire. They were the parents of the cotton merchant Carl Albrecht (1875–1952), who married Mary Ladson Robertson (1883–1960), who belonged to a prominent American family of the Southern aristocracy from Charleston, South Carolina; she was a descendant of James Ladson and several colonial governors of Carolina. Carl and Mary Albrecht were the parents of the medical doctor and psychologist Carl Albrecht (1902–1965). The latter was the father of the conductor George Alexander Albrecht and the European civil servant and later Prime Minister of Lower Saxony Ernst Albrecht. The conductor George Alexander Albrecht was the father of the chief conductor of the Dutch National Opera Marc Albrecht while Ernst Albrecht was the father of the President of the European Commission Ursula von der Leyen (née Albrecht) and of the businessman Hans-Holger Albrecht.

The family is included in the Deutsches Geschlechterbuch which covers prominent families in Germany.

The family's coat of arms features in red a golden lion that breaks a silver chain.

Family tree

Barthold Albrecht (1557–1642), pastor
Statius Albrecht (1603–1651), medical doctor
Johann Peter Albrecht (1651–1724), medical doctor
Johann Günter Albrecht (1676–1745), medical doctor (Oberlandphysicus) in Hildesheim
Johann Peter Albrecht (1703–1753), state councillor (Hof- und Regierungsrat) in the Electorate of Cologne
Johann Friedrich Albrecht (1737–1799), county governor of Isenhagen
Franz August Heinrich Albrecht (1766–1848), county governor of Syke
 Karl Franz Georg Albrecht (1799–1873), state councillor and director-general of customs in the Kingdom of Hanover
 George Alexander Albrecht (1834–1898), consul and cotton merchant in Bremen; married Baroness Louise Dorothea von Knoop (1844–1889)
 Carl Albrecht (1875–1952), cotton merchant in Bremen; married Mary Ladson-Robertson
 Carl Albrecht (1902–1965), medical doctor and psychologist
 George Alexander Albrecht (1935–2021), conductor
  Marc Albrecht (1964–), conductor
 Ernst Albrecht (1930–2014), director-general of the European Commission and Prime Minister of Lower Saxony
 Ursula von der Leyen (1958–), President of the European Commission
  Hans-Holger Albrecht (1963–), businessman

References

 
German families
 Alb